Below is a list of ships responsible for bombarding targets at Omaha Beach as part of the Normandy landings on June 6, 1944, the opening day of Operation Overlord, the Allied operation that launched the successful invasion of German-occupied western Europe during World War II.

Footnotes

References
 
 

Omaha Bombardment Group
Omaha Bombardment Group
Omaha Bombardment Group